The 2010 Winter Paralympics,  or the tenth Paralympic Winter Games, were held in Vancouver and Whistler, British Columbia, Canada from March 12 to 21, 2010. The Opening Ceremony took place in BC Place Stadium in Vancouver and the Closing Ceremony in Whistler Medals Plaza.

This was the first time Canada hosted the Winter Paralympic Games and second time it hosted the Paralympics – the first was the 1976 Summer Paralympics in Toronto.

On June 7, 2006, Prince Edward, as a member of the Canadian Royal Family and patron of the British Paralympic Association, raised the flag of the Paralympic Games outside Vancouver City Hall.

Brian McKeever of Canada became the first athlete to be named in a Winter Paralympics and Winter Olympics team in the same year, although he did not compete in the Olympic Games. (At the 2010 Winter Olympics, he was scheduled to compete in the men's 50 km cross-country race, but the coach replaced him with a skier who did well at an earlier event.) At the Paralympics, he competed in Cross-country skiing and Biathlon.

Viviane Forest became the first Paralympian to win a gold in both the Winter and Summer Games, by winning the Women's Downhill for Visually Impaired. She had previously won gold in the 2000 and 2004 Summer Paralympics for women's goalball.
Canadian Lauren Woolstencroft won 5 gold medals in alpine skiing, the most gold medals won by any Canadian Winter Paralympian at a single Games. Also German Verena Bentele won 5 gold medals, in biathlon and cross country skiing, and with that number they set the gold medal record for the 2010 Games.

Bidding process 

As part of a formal agreement between the International Paralympic Committee and the International Olympic Committee first established in 2001, the winner of the bid for the 2010 Winter Olympics was also to host the 2010 Winter Paralympics. Following the second and final round of voting at the 115th IOC Session in Prague, Czech Republic,  the right to host the 2010 Winter Olympics and Paralympics were awarded to Vancouver.

Development and preparation

Torch relay

The same torch design (silver with Paralympic logo) used for the Olympics was used for the Paralympic Games. On March 3, 2010, the torch began a 10-day journey from Ottawa to Vancouver. The relay involved approximately six hundred runners to carry the torch across ten Canadian cities in three provinces:

 Ottawa – March 3
 Quebec City – March 4
 Toronto, Ontario – March 5
 Esquimalt, BC and Victoria, BC – March 6
 Squamish, BC – March 7
 Whistler, BC – March 8
 Lytton and Hope, BC – March 9
 Vancouver (Riley Park) and Maple Ridge, BC – March 10
 Vancouver (University of British Columbia), BC – March 11
 Vancouver, BC – March 12 (24-hour relay)

Venues

Venues for the 2010 Winter Paralympics were shared between Vancouver and Whistler, as with the 2010 Winter Olympics.

Competition venues

Non-competition venues

Marketing

When the mascot, Sumi, an animal guardian spirit with the wings of the Thunderbird and legs of a black bear, was introduced, it was the first time the Olympic and Paralympic mascots were introduced at the same time.

To commemorate the 2010 Vancouver Olympic Games, 17 Canadian coins were issued for general circulation. Two of the circulation coins honour Paralympic sports: wheelchair curling (released on July 11, 2007) and ice sledge hockey (released on March 18, 2010). The circulation quarters omitted a traditional phrase, Dei Gratia Regina, from their obverse side, making them the first godless coins in circulation since 1911.

Specifications

Details

The Games

Opening Ceremonies
With a theme of "One Inspires Many," the Opening Ceremony featured over 5000 local performers.  Fifteen-year-old snowboarder Zach Beaumont, who is an amputee, was the final torch bearer and lit the Games Cauldron.  The 2 hours live ceremony was produced by Vancouver-based Patrick Roberge Productions Inc.

Participating nations
Forty-four National Paralympic Committees (NPCs) entered athletes at the 2010 Winter Paralympics. This was an increase of five from the 39 represented at the 2006 Winter Paralympics. The number in parentheses indicates the number of participants from each NPC.

 
 
 
 
 
 
 
 
 
 
 
 
 
 
 
 
 
 
 
 
 
 
 
 
 
 
 
 
 
 
 
 
 
 
 
 
 
 
 
 
 
 
 
 

A total of 506 athletes participated in the Games. This is an increase from the 476 athletes who participated in 2006.

Argentina and Romania took part in the Winter Paralympic Games for the first time, as did Bosnia and Herzegovina. All three have previously participated in several editions of the Summer Paralympics. Serbia also made its Winter Paralympics début as a distinct NPC, following its split with Montenegro.

Despite the overall increase of delegates and athletes, Latvia, which participated in Turin for the 2006 Winter Paralympics, did not send athletes to Vancouver.

Sports
Five sports were on the 2010 program:

Calendar
In the following calendar for the 2010 Winter Paralympic Games, each blue box represents an event competition, such as a qualification round, on that day. The yellow boxes represent days during which gold medal finals for a sport are held.

Medal count

The top ten NPCs by number of gold medals are listed below. The host nation, Canada, is highlighted.

Podium sweeps

Broadcasters
In Canada, the games were broadcast by Canada's Olympic Broadcast Media Consortium, a joint venture between CTVglobemedia and Rogers Media. The networks aired a greater amount of coverage than what had been shown in previous years, a total of 50 hours of coverage. Coverage included including a daily 90-minute highlight program, and live coverage of select sledge hockey matches (games involving Canada, plus the gold medal game) on CTV. The opening ceremony was broadcast live on CTV's Vancouver station CIVT-TV, followed by an encore aired nationally on CTV and Réseau Info Sports the following afternoon. While not originally planned, CTV and RDS also aired live coverage of the closing ceremony.

The games were aired on Universal Sports in the United States.

Paralympic Sport TV (paralympicsport.tv), the Internet TV channel of the International Paralympic Committee (IPC), offered international free online live and recorded coverage of the games, every day from 9:00 to 22:30 PST.

In New Zealand, SKY TV broadcast one hour of highlights each day, and full coverage of New Zealand athletes.

In the United Kingdom, BBC broadcast the Games, but only through the red button and online.

In Europe, Eurosport broadcast live the medal events in biathlon, alpine and cross-country skiing.

In France, France Télévisions provided live coverage on its website.

In Italy, Sky Sport provided record coverage with all games live on five dedicated HD channels.

In Australia, ABC1 broadcast the games.

In Norway, NRK broadcast the games. 30 hours of the Games were broadcast live. NRK-sport were critical to parts of the TV production from Vancouver, an issue they've notified to the EBU. Issues such as showing biathlon without showing the shooting, and in cross-country skiing there were numerous panorama shots of the same mountain area with skiers in the distance, making it hard to follow the progress of the competition. NRK were far more pleased with the production of the ice sledge hockey and wheelchair curling events, which they felt reached the same level as the Olympic Games.

Paralympic Media Awards
New Zealand's Sky Sport won the best broadcast award for their coverage of the Games. Gary Kingston writing for the Vancouver Sun took the best written category. While Jeff Crow won the best photography category for his picture of Shannon Dallas.

Legacy
In the winter sports season following the games, there was a notable increase in winter disability sports participation throughout British Columbia.

See also

 Integrated Security Unit
 Royal Canadian Mint Olympic Coins

References

External links

 
 Paralympic Sport TV, web-TV channel of the International Paralympic Committee (IPC)
 

 
P
2010 in multi-sport events
Paralympics
Sports competitions in Vancouver
2010
2010s in Vancouver
2010 in British Columbia
March 2010 sports events in Canada
Winter multi-sport events in Canada